Charles Cobb Blackmon (born July 1, 1986), nicknamed "Chuck Nazty", is an American professional baseball outfielder for the Colorado Rockies of Major League Baseball (MLB). He made his MLB debut in 2011, as a member of the Rockies. Blackmon throws and bats left-handed, stands , and weighs .

A native of Dallas, Texas, Blackmon attended the Georgia Institute of Technology, and played college baseball for the Yellow Jackets. The Rockies selected him in the second round of the 2008 amateur draft. Blackmon is a four-time MLB All Star, a two-time Silver Slugger Award winner, and the 2017 National League batting champion.

Amateur career
Born in Dallas, Texas, Blackmon is of partial English ancestry. Raised in Suwanee, Georgia, Blackmon was an outstanding baseball player at North Gwinnett High School, as a left-handed pitcher and outfielder. Aside from baseball, Blackmon also competed in basketball and football, and was named Academic Player of the Year three times.

Blackmon enrolled at Young Harris College, and played college baseball for the school as a pitcher for two years. At Young Harris, Blackmon won 15 games and had 138 strikeouts in 127 innings for the school, and was drafted for the first time after his freshman season. In 2005, he played collegiate summer baseball in the Cape Cod Baseball League for the Cotuit Kettleers.

Blackmon received a scholarship to Georgia Tech, and transferred in the fall of 2006. Blackmon had been recruited by Georgia Tech after his freshman season, but returned to Young Harris for his sophomore season as he had promised the team he would play for two seasons. Blackmon continued to pitch until his fourth and final year at Georgia Tech, after redshirting due to elbow tendinitis. As a fourth-year junior outfielder for Georgia Tech, Blackmon hit .396, hit eight home runs, and stole 25 bases as the leadoff hitter for the team. Blackmon also excelled academically, receiving various honors including being named to the 2008 ESPN The Magazine Academic All-America Second Team. He graduated from Georgia Tech in 2011 with a bachelor's degree in finance.

Professional career
Blackmon was drafted by the Colorado Rockies in the second round of the 2008 Major League Baseball draft. Blackmon had first been drafted in the 28th round in the 2004 draft by the Florida Marlins as a pitcher, and was also drafted in the 2005 draft in the 20th round by the Boston Red Sox. He spent 2008 with the Tri-City Dust Devils, hitting .338 in 68 games. In 2009, he was promoted to the Modesto Nuts, and hit .307 with 30 stolen bases in 133 games there. In 2010, he played for the Tulsa Drillers, and spent the first half of 2011 with the Colorado Springs Sky Sox.

Colorado Rockies

2011–2016

The Colorado Rockies called Blackmon up to the majors for the first time on June 6, 2011. Blackmon recorded his first MLB hit on June 8 at Petco Park against Dustin Moseley of the San Diego Padres with a one-out single to right field. He recorded his first MLB RBI on June 11 against Matt Guerrier of the Los Angeles Dodgers, driving in Seth Smith with a one-out single. Blackmon hit his first MLB home run on July 1, 2011 — his 25th birthday — in a pinch hit at-bat against Joakim Soria. He finished with a .255 batting average in 27 games.

The following two seasons, Blackmon spent the majority of the time between the Rockies and their AAA minor league team, as they didn't have playing time for him. After the 2013 season, the Rockies traded Dexter Fowler to the Houston Astros, thus creating an opening for Blackmon to win the center field job in 2014.

Entering the 2014 season, Blackmon was engaged in a competition for playing time in center field with Brandon Barnes, Corey Dickerson and Drew Stubbs. In the Rockies' home opener on April 14, 2014, Blackmon notched six hits from the leadoff spot in a 12–2 win over Arizona Diamondbacks. He homered, doubled three times, and tallied five RBI. He joined Ty Cobb (May 5, 1925), Jimmie Foxx (July 10, 1932), Edgardo Alfonzo (August 30, 1999), and Shawn Green (May 23, 2002) as the only players in MLB history to have six hits, five RBI, and four extra base hits in a single game. Blackmon was named to the roster as a reserve for the National League in the 2014 MLB All-Star Game, the first selection of his career. In his first full season in the majors, Blackmon finished with a .288 batting average, 28 stolen bases and 19 home runs. In 2015, despite a drop-off in the RBI section, Blackmon stole a career high 43 bases while continuing to hit for a high average.

On April 14, 2016, the Rockies placed Blackmon on the disabled list with turf toe. He returned to the lineup a week later. For the week of June 20, 2016, and August 15, 2016, Blackmon was named the NL Player of the Week by MLB. At the conclusion of the 2016 regular season, Blackmon was awarded a Silver Slugger Award for the first time in his career. He batted a slash-line of .324/.381/.552, which were all the highest totals comprised by Blackmon in a season up to this point in his career. This went along with 29 home runs and 82 runs batted in.

2017–present
For May 2017, Blackmon won his first NL Player of the Month Award. He led the NL in hits (42) and triples (five), was second in batting average (.359), fourth in runs scored (24), tied for fifth in RBI (22), and tied for seventh with a 1.037 on-base plus slugging (OPS). He was selected to play in the 2017 MLB All-Star Game, starting in center field and batting leadoff. Blackmon set an MLB record for the most RBIs by a leadoff hitter when he homered versus Hyun-Jin Ryu of the Dodgers on September 29 to reach 102 RBI, surpassing Darin Erstad's record set in 2000.

In 159 games played during 2017, Blackmon hit .331/.399/.601, winning the NL batting title. He became the first player in history to lead the major leagues in hits (213), runs scored (137), triples (14), and total bases (383) in the same season. His total bases were the most since Derrek Lee in 2005. The Rockies finished the year with an 87–75 record, clinching an NL Wild Card spot. Blackmon was fifth in 2017 NL MVP voting.

On April 4, 2018, Blackmon signed a six-year contract extension worth $108 million. Batting .276 with 17 home runs and 40 RBIs, he was named to the 2018 MLB All-Star Game. On September 30, he hit for the cycle against the Washington Nationals. He finished the 2018 season hitting .291/.358/.502 and led the National League with 119 runs scored.

In 2019, he batted .314/.364/.576 with 32 home runs and 112 runs scored. He was named to his fourth All-Star Game. In 2020, Blackmon began the season hitting almost .400 at one point but regressed towards the tail end of the season, finishing with a .303 batting average in 59 games. He also hit six home runs and led the team in RBI with 42.

In 2021, Blackmon batted .270/.351/.411 with 13 home runs and 78 RBIs. He led all National League outfielders with 14 assists.

Personal life
Blackmon has spoken about his Christian faith, saying, "The love that JC (Jesus Christ) has for me, even though I don’t deserve it is unimaginable. You know, that grace is something that I try to understand every day, but it’s hard to comprehend! I try and learn more about Christ every day, and will continue to walk my path and trust every opportunity that opens to me. I just want to represent our God in what I do, on the field, how I treat people and walking by faith." Blackmon is also in a Bible study group with the Rockies.

Blackmon grew up as a fan of the Atlanta Braves. Blackmon's father, Myron, was a track and field athlete at Georgia Tech.

In 2016, Denver 7 reported that Blackmon, despite his Major League salary, drove the same 2004 Jeep Grand Cherokee to spring training every day that he drove to school every morning as a high school senior.

Blackmon and his wife, Ashley, were married in 2018. Blackmon resides in the Belcaro neighborhood of Denver during the season.

See also

 Colorado Rockies individual awards
 List of Georgia Institute of Technology alumni
 List of Major League Baseball annual runs scored leaders
 List of Major League Baseball annual triples leaders
 List of Major League Baseball players to hit for the cycle
 List of Major League Baseball single-game hits leaders
 List of people from Dallas

References

External links

Georgia Tech Yellow Jackets bio

1986 births
Living people
Colorado Rockies players
Young Harris Mountain Lions baseball players
Georgia Tech Yellow Jackets baseball players
Cotuit Kettleers players
Tri-City Dust Devils players
Modesto Nuts players
Tulsa Drillers players
Scottsdale Scorpions players
Colorado Springs Sky Sox players
Toros del Este players
American expatriate baseball players in the Dominican Republic
People from Suwanee, Georgia
North Gwinnett High School alumni
Sportspeople from the Atlanta metropolitan area
Baseball players from Georgia (U.S. state)
Major League Baseball center fielders
National League All-Stars
National League batting champions
Silver Slugger Award winners
Young Harris College alumni